Mortemia is a Norwegian gothic metal one-man band created in 2009 by Morten Veland, the founder of Tristania and Sirenia.

History

2009 
On 6 July 2009 the band announced it had signed with Napalm Records.

2010: Misere Mortem 
The band's first album, titled Misere Mortem, was released in February 2010. A song from the album, "The One I Once Was", was made available on the band's MySpace page on 17 January 2010. The album was recorded at Veland's Audio Avenue Studios in Stavanger, Norway and Sound Suite Studios in France. It was produced, engineered and mixed by Veland himself.

2021–2022: Veland Music and The Pandemic Pandemonium Sessions 
On 20 April 2021, it had been announced that Mortemia would release a series of new songs as part of the EP The Pandemic Pandemonium Sessions, through Morten Veland's new record label, called Veland Music, for digital download. The musical concept is more melodic and diverse than the previous album, featuring several female guest vocalists in each song instead of the characteristic symphonic choir.

The first one, called "The Enigmatic Sequel", which features Madeleine Liljestam from the Swedish symphonic metal band Eleine, came out on 14 May 2021. The second one, called "Death Turns a Blind Eye", which features Marcela Bovio from the Dutch symphonic death metal band MaYaN, came out on 18 June 2021. A third song titled, "The Hour of Wrath", which features Alessia Scoletti from the Italian power metal band Temperance was released on 23 July 2021. On 10 September 2021, Mortemia released a fourth song called "Decadence Deepens Within", featuring Liv Kristine. On October 8, the fifth track "Devastation Bound" featuring Melissa Bonny from the Swiss symphonic metal band Ad Infinitum was released. On 10 December 2021, the sixth track "My Demons and I" with Brittney Slayes from the Canadian power metal band Unleash the Archers was released. On 29 January 2022, the seventh track "Here Comes Winter" with Maja Shining from the Danish alternative metal band Forever Still was released.

2022–present: The Covid Aftermath Sessions 
On 9 December 2022, Mortemia released a cover version of Madonna's "Frozen" with Federica Lanna from the Italian symphonic metal band Volturian on vocals.

Members
Morten Veland – vocals, all instruments, production, engineering, mixing

Discography

Studio albums 
Misere Mortem (2010)

EPs
The Pandemic Pandemonium Sessions (2022)
The Covid Aftermath Sessions (2023)

References

External links

Norwegian gothic metal musical groups
Musical groups established in 2009
2009 establishments in Norway
Musical groups from Stavanger
Napalm Records artists